Aegle is a genus of moths of the family Noctuidae.

Species
 Aegle agatha
 Aegle diatemna
 Aegle eberti
 Aegle exquisita
 Aegle flava
 Aegle gratiosa
 Aegle hedychroa (Turner, 1904)
 Aegle iranica
 Aegle koekeritziana (Hübner, [1799])
 Aegle limbobrunnea
 Aegle lineata
 Aegle margarita
 Aegle matutinalis
 Aegle nubila (Staudinger, 1891)
 Aegle ottoi
 Aegle petroffi
 Aegle rebeli
 Aegle semicana
 Aegle subflava (Erschoff, 1874)
 Aegle transversa
 Aegle vartianorum
 Aegle vespertalis
 Aegle vespertina
 Aegle vespertinalis

References

Hadeninae
Noctuoidea genera